Budgie is the debut album by the Welsh heavy metal band Budgie. It was released on July 30, 1971 through MCA Records. The US version on Kapp Records includes "Crash Course in Brain Surgery", originally released as a single and covered by Metallica on their 1987 EP The $5.98 E.P. - Garage Days Re-Revisited. "Homicidal Suicidal" has also been covered by the Seattle grunge band Soundgarden. Canadian band Thrush Hermit covered "Nude Disintegrating Parachutist Woman" on the album All Technology Aside, included on the 2010 The Complete Recordings box set.

Reception
 
Sounds criticized the album as being somewhat nondescript, but praised it for having "a lot of good natured foot-tapping music" and concluded "I certainly find it infinitely preferable to Black Sabbath, and I have the feeling that Budgie might develop into something a lot more interesting."

In a brief retrospective review, AllMusic declared that "For those seriously interested in metal's development, bombastic treasures like 'Homicidal Suicidal,' and 'Nude Disintegrating Parachutist Woman' are essential listening."

Track listing

Personnel 
Budgie
Tony Bourge  -  guitar
Burke Shelley  -  bass, vocals, mellotron
Ray Phillips  - drums, percussion
Additional personnel
Rodger Bain  -  production
Ray Dorsey  -  liner notes
Shepard Sherbell  -  design, photography
David Sparling  -  artwork, cover painting

References  

1971 debut albums
Kapp Records albums
Budgie (band) albums
Albums produced by Rodger Bain
MCA Records albums
Albums recorded at Rockfield Studios